The Monastery of Al-Karkas is a monastery in Egypt. It stands on a mountain and is said to be unapproachable by road.

References

Christian monasteries in Egypt